Pentamethyltantalum is a homoleptic organotantalum compound.
It has a propensity to explode when it is melted. Its discovery was part of a sequence that lead to Richard R. Schrock's Nobel Prize discovery in olefin metathesis.

Production
Pentamethyltantalum can be made from the reaction of methyllithium with Ta(CH3)3Cl2. Ta(CH3)3Cl2 is in turn made from tantalum pentachloride and dimethylzinc.

The preparation was inspired by the existence of pentaalkyl compounds of phosphorus and arsenic, and the discovery of hexamethyltungsten. The discoverer, Richard R. Schrock considered tantalum to be a metallic phosphorus, and tried the use of methyllithium.

Properties
The pentamethyltantalum adopts a square pyramid shape. Ignoring the C-H bonds, the molecule has C4v symmetry. The four carbon atoms at the base of the pyramid are called basal, and the carbon atom at the top is called apical or apex. The distance from tantalum to the apical carbon atom is 2.11 Å, and to the basal carbon atoms is 2.180 Å. The distance from hydrogen to carbon in the methyl groups is 1.106 Å. The angle subtended by two basal carbon bonds is 82.2°, and the angle between the bonds to the apex and a carbon on the base is about 111.7°.

At room temperature pentamethyltantalum can spontaneously explode, so samples are stored below 0°.

Reactions

With many carbon-hydrogen bonds near Ta, analogues of pentamethyltantalum are susceptible to alpha elimination.

Excess methyllithium reacts to yield higher coordinated methyl tantalum ions [Ta(CH3)6]− and [Ta(CH3)7]2−.

Pentamethyltantalum in solution forms stable insoluble complex material when mixed with dmpe (CH3)2PCH2CH2P(CH3)2.

With nitric oxide it gives a white coloured dimer with formula {TaMe3[ON(Me)NO]2}2 (Me=CH3).

References

Organometallic compounds
Tantalum compounds
Methyl complexes